The 1972 Charlotte Tennis Classic – Singles was an event of the 1972 Charlotte Tennis Classic tennis tournament played at the Julian J. Clark Tennis Stadium in Charlotte, North Carolina in the United States from April 18 through April 23, 1972. Arthur Ashe was the defending singles champion but lost in the first round. Second-seeded Ken Rosewall won the singles title, defeating unseeded Cliff Richey in the final, 2–6, 6–2, 6–2.

Seeds

Draw

Finals

Top half

Bottom half

References

External links
 ITF tournament edition details

Charlotte Tennis Classic
Charlotte Tennis Classic
1972 in sports in North Carolina